Edward McClain (March 7, 1899 – August 24, 1985), nicknamed "Boots", was an American Negro league infielder in the 1920s.

A native of Louisville, Kentucky, McClain made his Negro leagues debut in 1920 with the Dayton Marcos and Indianapolis ABCs. He went on to play for several teams, finishing his career back in Dayton in 1926. McClain died in Columbus, Ohio in 1985 at age 86.

References

External links
 and Baseball-Reference Black Baseball stats and Seamheads

1899 births
1985 deaths
Cleveland Tate Stars players
Columbus Buckeyes (Negro leagues) players
Dayton Marcos players
Detroit Stars players
Indianapolis ABCs players
Toledo Tigers players
Baseball players from Louisville, Kentucky
20th-century African-American sportspeople
Baseball infielders